We Are Ever So Clean is the debut album by Blossom Toes, released in 1967 on Marmalade Records. The album was reissued in 2007 by Sunbeam Records along with bonus tracks.

It is listed in Record Collector’s "100 Greatest Psychedelic Records". Richie Unterberger calls the album "One of the happiest, most underappreciated relics of British psychedelia."

Track listing

Personnel
Brian Belshaw - bass, vocals
Jim Cregan - guitar, vocals
Brian Godding - guitar, keyboards, vocals
Kevin Westlake - drums
David Whittaker - orchestration
Poli Palmer - percussion, vibes (Bonus tracks 22-25)

References

External links
Sunbeam Records info

1967 debut albums
Albums produced by Giorgio Gomelsky
Blossom Toes albums
Marmalade Records albums